Nishapuri or Nishaburi is a surname of Iranian origin. Notable people with the surname include:

 Hakim al-Nishaburi, Persian scholar (933–1014)
 Ghiyās od-Dīn Abul-Fatah Omār ibn Ibrāhīm Khayyām Nishābūrī (1048–1131), Persian poet, mathematician, philosopher and astronomer
 Attar Neyshapuri, pen name of Abū Ḥamīd bin Abū Bakr Ibrāhīm (c. 1145 – c. 1221), Persian poet, theoretician of Sufism, and hagiographer
 Bi Bi Monajemeh Nishaburi, female Persian mathematician and astronomer (1203–1280)

 Mirzá Áqá Buzurg-i-Nishapuri (1852–1869), Bahá'í martyr

See also 
 Nishapur

Surnames of Iranian origin